Tonight Belongs To The Young is a compilation of remastered demos from the American band Pretty Boy Floyd. The tracks were originally supposed to be released as their second album on MCA Records in the early 1990s but did not surface until 2003.

Track listing
 Tonight Belongs To The Young
 Hands Off My Radio
 Far Away
 Till The Real Thing Comes Along
 Five Long Days
 Restless
 Hold On To Your Dreams
 Stray Bullet
 Heaven Must Be Missing An Angel
 Gangster Of Love

Band
 Steve "Sex" Summers - Lead Vocals
 Kristy "Krash" Majors - Guitar
 Vinnie Chas - Bass
 Kari Kane - Drums

Credit
Paula Janecek 	- artwork, layout design

Pretty Boy Floyd (American band) albums
2003 compilation albums
Demo albums